Ledovskoy or Ledovskoi (from лёд meaning ice) is a Russian masculine surname, its feminine counterpart is Ledovskaya. It may refer to
Tatyana Ledovskaya (born 1966), Russian hurdler

Russian-language surnames